Love's Messenger is an 1885 watercolor by Marie Spartali Stillman in which a dove has just carried a love letter to a woman standing in front of an open window. She wears a red rose, and has just put down her embroidery of a blind-folded Cupid.

The artist modestly described the painting in 1906:

Critic Jan Marsh suggests that the studio with the bull's eye windows may have been in Edward Burne-Jones's house "The Grange" in Fulham.

The painting, paper mounted on wood, was purchased in 1901 by Samuel Bancroft and is now in the Delaware Art Museum.

The painting
Love's Messenger reflects the influence of both early Pre-Raphaelite painting and Italian Renaissance painting. The symbols portrayed in the painting, including the dove, rose, ivy, and the blind-folded Cupid "suggest constancy, fidelity, and loveliness in full bloom," but also suggest "beauty on the cusp of decay, sensuality, and the pain Cupid's arrows may inflict."  The presence of Venus is shown by the rose and the dove, so that the "scene may offer a contrast between the beauty, love, and abundance of Venus and the sensuality and unpredictability of her son Cupid."

Provenance and exhibitions
The artist exhibited the painting at the Grosvenor Gallery in London in 1885. This gallery is considered to have been a crucial outlet for Stillman's works and Love's Messenger is considered one of the most important works she displayed there in the 1880s.
Samuel Bancroft, Jr. purchased the painting in 1901 for £100, after seeing it at the house of the artist's daughter Effie (Euphrosyne) Stillman.  It was then exhibited in Philadelphia (1901), before being donated to the Delaware Art Museum (then known as the Wilmington Society of the Fine Arts) in 1935. It has also been displayed in Washington (1977), Richmond (1982), and New Haven (1996).

References

Sources
 See, especially, pp. 262–263.

Pre-Raphaelite paintings
Watercolor paintings
1885 paintings
Paintings in the Delaware Art Museum
Paintings of Cupid
Birds in art
Water in art